Saqr bin Zayed Al Nahyan was the Ruler of Abu Dhabi from 1926 to 1928. He was the half brother of Sultan bin Zayed bin Khalifa Al Nahyan (Ruler of Abu Dhabi from 1922 to 1926), whom he shot and killed to become Ruler himself. He was the uncle of Zayed bin Sultan Al Nahyan and Shakhbut bin Sultan Al Nahyan, his successor. 

At the instigation of Khalifah bin Zayed, an assassination attempt was made against him on New Year's Day 1928 by members of the Al-Bu Shaar section of the Al Manasir. This failed, but members of the Al-Bu Shaar later caught up with and killed him.

References

1928 deaths
House of Al Nahyan
Emirati politicians
Sheikhs of Abu Dhabi
Year of birth missing